Rudy Linterman (born October 30, 1947) is a former professional Canadian football running back who played for the Calgary Stampeders from 1968 through 1977, and for the Toronto Argonauts in 1977. He won the Dr. Beattie Martin Trophy in 1974.

Linterman finished with career totals of 157 games played with 1,399 rushing yards and 4,908 receiving yards and 20 career TDs. Perhaps he is best known for having 68 receiving yards in the terrible weather that accompanied the 1971 Grey Cup.

Rudy was added to the Wall of Fame at McMahon Stadium on September 14, 2012.

References

1947 births
Living people
Calgary Stampeders players
Canadian football running backs
Idaho Vandals football players
Canadian football people from Calgary
Players of Canadian football from Alberta
Toronto Argonauts players